Bengt Henrik (Pentti Heikki) Hiidenheimo (29 January 1875, Vihti – 16 February 1918; surname until 1906 Törnström) was a Finnish farmer and politician. He was a Member of the Parliament of Finland from 1913 to 1917, representing the Finnish Party. Hiidenheimo was shot by Red Guards during the Finnish Civil War.

References

1875 births
1919 deaths
People from Vihti
People from Uusimaa Province (Grand Duchy of Finland)
Finnish Party politicians
Members of the Parliament of Finland (1913–16)
Members of the Parliament of Finland (1916–17)
People of the Finnish Civil War (White side)